Audubon is a non-fiction book written by Constance Rourke (1885-1941). It retroactively received the Newbery Honor award for the year 1937.

Rourke's book is a biography of ornithologist and painter John James Audubon.

References 

1936 children's books
Children's non-fiction books
Newbery Honor-winning works
American biographies
American children's books